Mhlosheni is a town within south western Eswatini about 25 kilometres north-west of Hluthi and 75 kilometres west of Maloma.

Famous people born in the town include former Eswatini Deputy Prime Minister Obed Dlamini.

References 

Populated places in Eswatini